The 1982 Montreal Expos season was the 14th season in franchise history. They finished 86-76, 6 games back of the St. Louis Cardinals in the National League East.

Offseason
 January 14, 1982: Grant Jackson was traded by the Expos to the Kansas City Royals for Ken Phelps.
 March 31, 1982: Larry Parrish and Dave Hostetler were traded by the Expos to the Texas Rangers for Al Oliver.

Spring training
The Expos held spring training at West Palm Beach Municipal Stadium in West Palm Beach, Florida – a facility they shared with the Atlanta Braves. It was their sixth season at the stadium; they had conducted spring training there from 1969 to 1972 and since 1981.

Regular season
 May 9, 1982: Spaceman Bill Lee was released after not showing up at a game. Lee did not show up as a sign of protest because the Expos had released second baseman Rodney Scott.
 August 4, 1982: Joel Youngblood became the first player in history to get hits for two teams in two cities on the same day. Youngblood had driven in the winning run for the Mets in an afternoon game at Wrigley Field against the Chicago Cubs, and then singled in a night game for the Expos in Philadelphia after he had been traded. The two pitchers he hit safely against, Ferguson Jenkins of the Cubs and Steve Carlton of the Philadelphia Phillies, are both in the Baseball Hall of Fame.

Opening Day starters
 Gary Carter
 Warren Cromartie
 Andre Dawson
 Wallace Johnson
 Al Oliver
 Tim Raines
 Scott Sanderson
 Chris Speier
 Tim Wallach

Season standings

Record vs. opponents

Notable transactions
 April 5, 1982: Bobby Ramos was traded by the Expos to the New York Yankees for Brad Gulden.
 May 5, 1982: Rowland Office was released by the Expos.
 May 22, 1982: Jerry Manuel was traded by the Expos to the San Diego Padres for Kim Seaman.
 June 8, 1982: The Expos traded a player to be named later to the San Diego Padres for Jerry Manuel. The Expos completed the deal by sending Mike Griffin to the Padres on August 30.
 June 15, 1982: Dan Schatzeder was purchased by the Expos from the San Francisco Giants.
 August 4, 1982: The Expos traded a player to be named later to the New York Mets for Joel Youngblood. The Expos completed the deal by sending Tom Gorman to the Mets on August 16.
 August 15, 1982: Casey Candaele was signed by the Expos as an amateur free agent.

All-Star game
On July 13, 1982, the All-Star Game moved across the border and was played in Montreal's Olympic Stadium. It was the first Midsummer Classic ever to be held outside of the United States. The National League won 4–1 before a crowd of 59 057. Steve Rogers was the winning pitcher and Dennis Eckersley took the loss. Dave Concepción was named MVP. Five players represented the Expos on the National League squad: Gary Carter, Andre Dawson, Tim Raines, Al Oliver and Rogers.

Roster

Player stats

Batting

Starters by position
Note: Pos = Position; G = Games played; AB = At bats; H = Hits; Avg. = Batting average; HR = Home runs; RBI = Runs batted in

Other batters
Note: G = Games played; AB = At bats; H = Hits; Avg. = Batting average; HR = Home runs; RBI = Runs batted in

Pitching

Starting pitchers 
Note: G = Games pitched; IP = Innings pitched; W = Wins; L = Losses; ERA = Earned run average; SO = Strikeouts

Other pitchers 
Note: G = Games pitched; IP = Innings pitched; W = Wins; L = Losses; ERA = Earned run average; SO = Strikeouts

Relief pitchers 
Note: G = Games pitched; W = Wins; L = Losses; SV = Saves; ERA = Earned run average; SO = Strikeouts

Award winners
 Gary Carter, Gold Glove Award, Catcher
 Andre Dawson, Gold Glove Award, Outfield
 Tim Raines, National League Stolen Base Leader, 78 
 Steve Rogers, Pitcher of the Month, April

1982 Major League Baseball All-Star Game
 Gary Carter, catcher
 Andre Dawson, outfield
 Tim Raines, outfield
 Al Oliver, first baseman
 Steve Rogers, pitcher

Farm system

Notes

References

External links
 1982 Montreal Expos team page at Baseball Reference
 1982 Montreal Expos team page at www.baseball-almanac.com

Montreal Expos seasons
Montreal Expos season
1980s in Montreal
1982 in Quebec